Władysław Szpilman (5 December 1911 – 6 July 2000) was a Polish pianist and classical composer of Jewish descent. Szpilman is widely known as the central figure in the 2002 Roman Polanski film The Pianist, which was based on Szpilman's autobiographical account of how he survived the German occupation of Warsaw and the Holocaust.

Szpilman studied piano at music academies in Berlin and Warsaw. He became a popular performer on Polish radio and in concert. Confined within the Warsaw ghetto after the German invasion of Poland, Szpilman spent two years in hiding. Towards the end of his concealment, he was helped by Wilm Hosenfeld, a German officer who detested Nazi policies. After World War II, Szpilman resumed his career on Polish radio. Szpilman was also a prolific composer; his output included hundreds of songs and many orchestral pieces.

Career as a pianist 
Szpilman began his study of the piano at the Chopin Academy of Music in Warsaw, Poland, where he studied piano with Aleksander Michałowski and Józef Śmidowicz, first- and second-generation pupils of Franz Liszt. In 1931, he was a student of the prestigious Academy of Arts in Berlin, Germany, where he studied with Artur Schnabel, Franz Schreker, and Leonid Kreutzer. After Adolf Hitler was appointed Chancellor of Germany in 1933, Szpilman returned to Warsaw, where he quickly became a celebrated pianist and composer of both classical and popular music. Primarily a soloist, he was also the chamber music partner of such acclaimed violinists as Roman Totenberg, Ida Haendel and Henryk Szeryng, and in 1934, he toured Poland with U.S. violinist, Bronislav Gimpel.

On 5 April 1935, Szpilman joined the Polish Radio, where he worked as a pianist performing classical and jazz music. His compositions at this time included orchestral works, piano pieces, and also music for films, as well as roughly 50 songs, many of which became quite popular in Poland. At the time of the German invasion of Poland in September 1939, he was a celebrity and a featured soloist at the Polskie Radio, which was bombed on 23 September 1939, shortly after broadcasting the last Chopin recital played by Szpilman. The Nazi occupiers established the General Government, and created ghettos in many Polish cities, including Warsaw. Szpilman and his family did not yet need to find a new residence, as their apartment was already in the ghetto area.

Survival during the Holocaust 

Władysław Szpilman and his family, along with all other Jews living in Warsaw, were forced to move into a "Jewish quarter" – the Warsaw Ghetto – on 31 October 1940. Once all the Jews were confined within the ghetto, a wall was constructed to separate them from the rest of the Nazi German-occupied city. Szpilman managed to find work as a musician to support his family, which included his mother, father, brother Henryk, and two sisters, Regina and Halina. He first worked at the Nowoczesna Cafe, where the patrons sometimes ignored his playing in order to conduct business, as he recalled in the memoir.

Szpilman later played in a cafe on Sienna Street and after 1942 in the Sztuka Cafe on Leszno Street as well. In these last two cafes he performed chamber music with violinist Zygmunt Lederman, performed in the piano duo with Andrzej Goldfeder, and played with other musicians as well.

A member of the Jewish Police assisting in deportations, who recognized Szpilman, pulled him from a line of people—including his parents, brother, and two sisters—being loaded onto a train at the transport site (which, as in other ghettos, was called the Umschlagplatz). None of Szpilman's family members survived the war. Szpilman stayed in the ghetto as a labourer, and helped smuggle in weapons for the coming Jewish resistance uprising. Szpilman remained in the Warsaw Ghetto until 13 February 1943, shortly before it was abolished after the deportation of most of its inhabitants in April–May 1943.

Szpilman found places to hide in Warsaw and survived with the help of his friends from Polish Radio and fellow musicians such as Andrzej Bogucki and his wife Janina, Czesław Lewicki, and Helena Lewicka supported by Edmund Rudnicki, Witold Lutosławski, Eugenia Umińska, Piotr Perkowski, and Irena Sendler. He evaded capture several times. Beginning in August 1944, Szpilman was hiding out in an abandoned building at Aleja Niepodległości Street 223. In November, he was discovered there by the German officer, Captain Wilm Hosenfeld. To Szpilman's surprise, the officer did not arrest or kill him; after discovering that the emaciated Szpilman was a pianist, Hosenfeld asked him to play something on the piano that was on the ground floor. Szpilman played Chopin's Nocturne No. 20 in C♯ minor. After that, the officer brought him bread and jam on numerous occasions. He also offered Szpilman one of his coats to keep warm in the freezing temperatures. Szpilman did not know the name of the German officer until 1951. Despite the efforts of Szpilman and the Poles to rescue him, Hosenfeld died in a Soviet prisoner of war camp in 1952.

Polish Radio 
Szpilman started playing for Polish Radio in 1935 as their house pianist. In 1939, on 23 September, Szpilman was in the middle of broadcasting when Germans opened fire on the studio and he was forced to stop playing. This was the last live music broadcast that was heard until the war's end. When Szpilman resumed his job at Polish Radio in 1945, he did so by carrying on where he left off six years before: poignantly, he opened the first transmission by once again playing Chopin's Nocturne in C-sharp Minor (Lento con gran espressione).

From 1945 to 1963, Szpilman was director of the Popular Music Department at Polish Radio. Szpilman performed at the same time as a concert pianist and chamber musician in Poland, as well as throughout Europe, Asia, and America. During this period, he composed several symphonic works and about 500 other compositions that are still popular in Poland today. He also wrote music for radio plays and films and in 1961, he created the International Song Contest in Sopot, Poland, which has been produced every summer for more than 50 years.
Szpilman and Bronislav Gimpel founded the Warsaw Piano Quintet in 1963 with which Szpilman performed more than 2000 concerts worldwide until 1986 in such places as Royal Festival Hall in London; Salle Pleyel and Salle Gaveau in Paris; Herkules Saal in Munich; as well as the Salzburger Festspiele, Brahmstage Baden-Baden, Musikhalle Hamburg a.o.

Compositions 
From his early Berlin years, Szpilman never gave up the will to write music, even when living in the Warsaw Ghetto. His compositions include orchestral works, concertos, piano pieces, but also significant amounts of music for radio plays and films, as well as around 500 songs. More than 100 of these are very well known as hits and evergreens in Poland. In the 1950s, he wrote about 40 songs for children, for which he received an award from the Polish Composers Union in 1955.

His son Andrzej commented in 1998 that Szpilman's works did not reach a larger audience outside Poland, attributing this to the "division of Europe into two halves culturally as well as politically" after the war. His father "shaped the Polish popular music scene over several decades—but the western frontier of Poland constituted a barrier" to music from the Eastern bloc countries. (Andrzej Szpilman's "Foreword" to the 1999 edition of The Pianist, p. 8)

Szpilman's compositions include the suite for piano "Life of the Machines" 1932, Violin Concerto 1933, "Waltzer in the Olden Style" 1937, film soundtracks: "Świt, dzień i noc Palestyny" (1934), Wrzos (1938) and Doctor Murek (1939), Concertino for Piano and Orchestra (1940), Paraphrase on Own Themes (1948) "Ouverture for Symphonic Orchestra" (1968) and many very popular songs in Poland. His works are now published in printed editions by Boosey & Hawkes/Bote & Bock Music Publishers in New York, Berlin, and London.

In 1961, he initiated and organized Sopot International Song Festival produced in Poland every summer, now for more than 50 years. He founded the Polish Union of Authors of Popular Music.

The book 
The Death of a City (original "Śmierć miasta") was written by Wladyslaw Szpilman and elaborated by Jerzy Waldorff shortly after the war ended, and first printed in 1946 by publishing house Wiedza, The book was censored by Stalinist authorities for political reasons. For example, the nationality of benevolent German officer Wilm Hosenfeld was changed to Austrian. As the East German dissident singer-songwriter Wolf Biermann observed in his epilogue for the 1999 English-language edition: "Directly after the war it was impossible to publish a book in Poland which presented a German officer as a brave and helpful man," and an Austrian hero would be "not quite so bad." Biermann added caustically, "In the years of the Cold War Austria and East Germany were linked by a common piece of hypocrisy: both pretended to have been forcibly occupied by Hitler's Germany."

In 1998, Szpilman's son Andrzej published new extended edition of his father's memoir, first in German translation from Karin Wolff as Das wunderbare Überleben (The Miraculous Survival) by a German publishing house Ullstein Verlag; and then in English translation by Anthea Bell as The Pianist with Epilogue by Wolf Biermann. In March 1999 Władysław Szpilman visited London for Jewish Book Week, where he met English readers to mark the publication of the book in Great Britain. It was later published in more than 35 languages, named Best book of the year by Los Angeles Times, Sunday Times, Boston Globe, The Guardian, The Economist, Library Journal, won Annual Jewish Quarterly Wingate Prize 2000, Best book of the year 2001  by magazine Lire and Elle (Paris) in 2002. New Polish edition, Pianista : warszawskie wspomnienia 1939–1945 (Kraków: Znak, 2000) became a number 1 on the bestseller list by Polish newspaper Rzeczpospolita for 3 years in 2001–2003.

As it reached a much larger audience, Szpilman's memoir was widely praised. Britain's Independent described it as "a compelling, harrowing masterpiece"; it is "one of the most powerful accounts ever written" of the era declared another leading British daily. The book's description of the famed Warsaw teacher and writer Janusz Korczak has been described as "overwhelmingly powerful and poignant." Korczak declined to save himself from deportation to Treblinka, instead walked with the children of his orphanage to the deportation site and ultimately escorting them "into the next world," as Szpilman related:

The 1999 English-language edition also includes excerpts from Wilm Hosenfeld's diary (1942–44). Biermann's Epilogue gives further insight into Hosenfeld's deeds and his character. He aided several other would-be victims in Warsaw; Hosenfeld nonetheless died (in 1952) after seven years in Soviet captivity, despite the efforts of Szpilman to help him.

Although it concludes with his survival, Szpilman declined to conclude his memoir on a happy note. In the final paragraphs, he walks the streets of an abandoned and devastated Warsaw: "A stormy wind rattled the scrap-iron in the ruins, whistling and howling through the charred cavities of the windows. Twilight came on. Snow fell from the darkening, leaden sky." As one reviewer noted, "these final sentences distill the style of this astonishing and unforgettable book. Concise yet highly evocative; measured and somewhat detached, yet possessing a poeticism and a consistent spiritual tenor and strength."

Film adaptation
In 2002, the Polish-French film-maker, Roman Polanski, directed a screen version of the book. The movie won three Academy Awards in 2003 – Oscars for best director; best actor, and best adapted screenplay, the British Academy of Film and Television Arts Best Film Award, and the Palme d'Or at the Cannes Film Festival. Polanski escaped the Kraków Ghetto and survived the Nazi genocides but his mother was killed by the German occupiers. Polanski's film closely follows the book's style and details. Adrien Brody accepting the Oscar for Best Actor in a Leading Role The Pianist said – ..."This film would not be possible without the blueprint provided by Wladyslaw Szpilman. This is a tribute to his survival"...

Szpilman's son, Andrzej Szpilman, compiled and released a CD with the most popular songs Szpilman had composed under the title Wendy Lands Sings the Songs of the Pianist (Universal Music). Other CDs with the works of Szpilman include Works for Piano and Orchestra by Władysław Szpilman with Ewa Kupiec (piano), John Axelrod (director), and the Berlin Radio Symphony Orchestra (2004) (Sony classical) and the Original recordings of The Pianist and Władysław Szpilman-Legendary recordings (Sony classical). In November 1998, Szpilman was honored by the president of Poland with a Commander's Cross with Star of the Order of Polonia Restituta.

Death and tributes 
Szpilman died of natural causes in Warsaw on 6 July 2000, aged 88. He is buried at Powązki Military Cemetery.  On 25 September 2011, Polish Radio’s Studio 1 was renamed for Władysław Szpilman.  On 4 December 2011, a commemorative plaque to Szpilman, engraved in Polish and English, was unveiled at 223 Niepodległości Avenue in Warsaw, in the presence of his wife Halina Szpilman and son Andrzej, and Wilm Hosenfeld's daughter Jorinde Krejci-Hosenfeld.  The next day, on the exact centenary of Szpilman's birth, Polish President Bronisław Komorowski met Szpilman's widow and son, and Krejci-Hosenfeld.

Uri Caine, an American classical and jazz pianist and composer, created his own interpretations of Szpilman’s works in a variety of genres. The CD of Caine's concert was released on 24 February 2014.

Recordings 
 CD "F.Chopin – Works" - National Edition – F.Chopin – Piano trio und Introduction und Polonaise – W. Szpilman, T. Wronski, A. Ciechanski, Muza Warsaw 1958 and 2002
 CD "J. Brahms – Piano Quintett" The Warsaw Piano Quintett, Muza Warsaw 1976
 CD "Wladyslaw Szpilman – Ein musikalisches Portrait" Works by Szpilman, Rachmaninov und Chopin, Alinamusic Hamburg 1998
 CD Władysław Szpilman – Portret [5 CD Box-Set] Polskie Radio Warszawa 2000
 CD Wladyslaw Szpilman. The Original Recordings of the Pianist. Sony Classical 2002
 CD The Pianist [Soundtrack] Sony Classical 2002
 CD Songs of Wladyslaw Szpilman – sings Wendy Lands, Universal Music USA 2003
 CD Works For Piano & Orchestra Sony Classical 2004
 CD Władysław Szpilman – Legendary Recordings [3 CD Box-Set] Sony Classical 2005

Selected published works 
 Władysław Szpilman: Suite. The Life of the Machines for Piano (1933). Boosey & Hawkes Berlin/New York 2004 
 Władysław Szpilman: Concertino, Piano and Orchestra, Piano parts, Schott Mainz 2004 
 Władysław Szpilman: Concertino, Piano and Orchestra, Partitur Schott Mainz 2004 
 My memories of you. 16 selected songs by The Pianist Władysław Szpilman Boosey & Hawkes Berlin/New York 2003

See also 
 9973 Szpilman (main belt asteroid)
Andrzej Bogucki

References

Further reading

External links 

Władysław Szpilman information and biography
In Loving Memory Of Władysław Szpilman
Information on Szpilman's works at Boosey & Hawkes
"Szpilman's Warsaw: The History behind The Pianist" at the United States Holocaust Memorial Museum
Interview with Dr. Halina Grzecznarowska-Szpilman, widow of Władysław Szpilman, first part
Interview with Dr. Halina Grzecznarowska Szpilman, widow of Władysław Szpilman, second part 
Władysław Szpilman at culture.pl
Information on Wladyslaw Szpilman at Polish Biographical Dictionary by Polish Academy of Sciences, Kraków 2013 
Uri Caine – performance of songs by Władisław Szpilman
 

 
1911 births
2000 deaths
20th-century classical composers
Burials at Powązki Military Cemetery
Commanders with Star of the Order of Polonia Restituta
Jewish classical pianists
Jewish classical composers
Musicians from Warsaw
People from Sosnowiec
Polish classical composers
Polish male classical composers
Polish classical musicians
Polish classical pianists
Male classical pianists
Polish film score composers
Male film score composers
Jewish Combat Organization members
Polish songwriters
Polish male writers
Warsaw Ghetto inmates
20th-century classical pianists
20th-century male musicians